This list contains the names of albums that contain a hidden track and also information on how to find them. Not all printings of an album contain the same track arrangements, so some copies of a particular album may not have the hidden track(s) listed below. Some of these tracks may be hidden in the pregap, and some hidden simply as a track following the listed tracks. The list is ordered by artist name using the surname where appropriate.

 Ian Broudie, Tales Told: Last track is a hidden track titled "Broudie's Blues"
 Iain Archer, Flood the Tanks: hidden track called "That one you always do"
 Iced Earth, Dystopia: after some seconds of "Tragedy & Triumph" a (joking) choir begins.
 Idlewild, Warnings/Promises: Reprise of "Too Long Awake" follows some silence and the final track "Goodnight"
 Iedereen Zóôò Jotje: In Den Olden Rupsch Geloogheerd: After complete silence for 3 minutes there are numerous outtakes heard.
 Ignite, Our Darkest Days: Last track - "Live for Better Days" - on the album "Our Darkest Days." After the songs ends there is silence which eventually is followed by a song which is sung in Hungarian.
 Ima Robot, Ima Robot: "Black Jettas" is a hidden track (still listed on the corner of the CD) after last track "What Are We Made From"
 Natalie Imbruglia, Left of the Middle: "Left of the Middle", but not in Australia.
 Ildjarn, Strength and Anger: There is a hidden track after a few seconds of the eighth track.
 Imperial Drag (Jellyfish splinter group) : There is an uncredited 14th track following "Scaredy Cats & Egomaniacs," commonly called "Down with the Man."
 Imagine Dragons: Night Visions: After the song "Nothing Left to Say" is the hidden track "Rocks".
 Immortal, Diabolical Fullmoon Mysticism: Track 1 is not listed on the back cover.
 Immortal Technique, Revolutionary Vol. 1: When the CD is played on the computer, an untitled hidden track, featuring Diabolic, appears ten seconds after the end of "Dance with the Devil."
 The Inbreds, Winning Hearts: Untitled audio of a rotary phone being thrown onto a floor is the final hidden track on the CD. 
 The Inchtabokatables, Ultra: Tracks 13, 14 and 15 are unlisted hidden tracks. Track 13 is silence. Track 14 "Wars Only Wars (Long Version)". Track 15 are sounds from an analog modem.
 Incubus:
 S.C.I.E.N.C.E.: "Jose Loves Kate Moss, Part 1"/"Segue 1" follows on from the final track, Calgone.
 Enjoy Incubus: "Hidden Bonus" follows about eleven minutes after the final song "Hilikus."
 When Incubus Attacks Volume 1: "Smokin' The Herb Again" plays after about a minute of silence.
 Infester, To The Depths, In Degradation: Track "Outro" is unlisted.
 Indigo Girls, Come on Now Social: "Sister (Reprise)" follows on from "Faye Tucker," and is also then followed by "Philosophy of Loss"
 Infinite, Over the Top: After the final track, "Real Story"
 Innerpartysystem, Innerpartysystem (album): A track called "Home" follows the final track and comprises weird, electronic sounds and city noise.
 Insane Clown Posse, Crystal Ball : After song ends there are several minutes of silence followed by several hidden songs and skits.
 The Terror Wheel : After "The Smog" ends, an untitled track which is roughly two minutes comes on & there's a hidden number directly after "Amy's in the Attic"
 "Tunnel of Love": at the end of "When I Get Out" there's a track called "You're a Stupid Ass" which (like the end of Terror Wheel) has a phone number hidden in it
 Forgotten Freshness Volume 3: An unnamed hidden track starts playing after "Take Me Home."
 Bizzar: The Pendulum's Promise has one in the middle and end
 Bang! Pow! Boom!: each edition has different tracks hidden in the last song of the same name
 I Remember 2006
 Our Beautiful World: After being downloading, the twelfth song called "Question" becomes visible.  
 No More Bait: After the end of the song "March (Continued)," there is silence that lasts for 1 minute and 18 seconds. Then shuffling of items can be heard. Then Rafe LaNore starts playing on a violin tuner.
 Iron Maiden:
 Piece of Mind: At the beginning of the sixth song, Still Life, the drummer, Nicko McBrain can be heard saying a backwards message. It was originally put in as a joke because the band was being accused of satanism (which was false) at the time.
 Isengard, Vinterskugge: The song "Gjennom Skogen Til Blaafjellene" fades out at 1:12 and fades back in at 1:15.
 Islands, Return to the Sea: "Bucky Little Wing" follows final track. There is about 4 minutes of silence or rain/wind (depending on when you got the CD) and plays for 4 minutes and goes back to silence/rain/wind for 7 or 8 more minutes.
 ist, King Martha: "Idiot's Refrain" follows on from "Selfish Terrors" after approximately 4 minutes of silence.
 Isvind, Dark Waters Stir: "Lyset Flakker" starts at 12:35 after the final track.
 Ivy Queen, Ivy Queen 2008 World Tour LIVE!: Three hidden tracks: "Dat Sexy Body," "Quiero Saber," and "Uh-Oh" immediately follow "Papi Te Quiero."

See also
 List of backmasked messages
 List of albums with tracks hidden in the pregap

References 

I